Egg Lagoon is a rural locality in the local government area (LGA) of King Island in the North-west and west LGA region of Tasmania. The 2016 census recorded a population of 24 for the state suburb of Egg Lagoon.

History 
Egg Lagoon was gazetted as a locality in 1971. The name is believed to come from the finding of a large number of goose eggs in the area.

Geography
The waters of the Southern Ocean form the western boundary, and those of Bass Strait the eastern.

Road infrastructure 
Route B25 (North Road) runs through from south to north.

References

Towns in Tasmania
King Island (Tasmania)